The Disney Davy Crockett Ranch is a campground at Disneyland Paris which consists of 595 cabins in a quiet, wooded area located outside the perimeters of the main resort.

The ranch is about a 15-minute drive from the theme parks. Cabins include a TV, double bed, a bunk bed and convertible sofa bed.  It is similar to Disney's Fort Wilderness Resort & Campground at the Walt Disney World Resort in Florida.

Cabins
The cabins are for self-catering stays and each cabin has private parking and a barbecue area. 

1 Bedroom Cabins - a lounge with a convertible sofa, a separate bedroom with one double bed and a set of bunk beds (the bunk beds are not suitable for persons more than 70kg (approx. 11 stone). The upper bed is not suitable for children under 6 years). All cabins have a bathroom with a bath with a shower head, self-catering facilities, telephone, television with international channels and radio. Kitchen: refrigerator, microwave, hob, crockery and utensils, kettle, dishwasher and washing up kit. The beds are already made on your arrival, towels are provided.

2 Bedroom Cabins - a lounge with a convertible sofa, one bedroom with a double bed and one bedroom with bunk beds (the bunk beds are not suitable for persons more than 70kg (approx. 11 stone). The upper bed is not suitable for children under 6 years). All cabins have a bathroom with a bath with a shower head, self-catering facilities, telephone, television with international channels and radio. Kitchen: refrigerator, microwave, hob, crockery and utensils, kettle, dishwasher and washing up kit. The beds are already made on your arrival, towels are provided.

Trails
The cabins are divided over a number of so-called 'trails':

 101-197 Mocassin Trail
 201-284 Wagon Wheel Trail
 1001-1062 Timber Trail
 1101-1176 Bobcat Trail
 1201-1282 Big Bear Trail
 1301-1360 Cherokee Trail
 1401-1479 Tomahawk Trail
 1501-1555 Coyote Trail

Each trail has its own "chalet" where breakfast can be picked up in the morning.

Village
 Crockett's Tavern (restaurant)
 Blue Springs Pool (swimming pool)
 Alamo Trading Post (boutique)
 Saloon (bar)
 Tennis Court
 Davy's Farm
 Amphitheater
 Lucky Raccoon (video arcade)
 Bowie's Bike Barn
 Jogging Track
 Tree Top Trail Adventure

History
The very first employees of the Euro Disney were housed in Disney's Davy Crockett Ranch (then known as Camp Davy Crockett). The Ranch was operational by September 1991, before the other hotels. Crockett's Tavern was the first restaurant to open on 2 February 1992 at the Ranch.

Disney Davy Crockett Ranch officially opened with the Euro Disney Resort in April 1992.

On 26 July 2020, Disney rebranded all their onsite hotels by  dropping the possessive apostrophe. This meant the name was changed from Disney's Davy Crockett Ranch to Disney Davy Crockett Ranch.

Activities
There are many activities residents can participate in.

Swimming
Climbing
Riding
Safari
Archery
Basketball
Pony rides

References

Davy Crockett Ranch
Hotels established in 1991
Hotel buildings completed in 1991
Davy Crockett
1991 establishments in France